The 2018 World Nomad Games (Kyrgyz: Дүйнөлүк көчмөндөр оюндары 2018, Russian: Всемирные игры кочевников 2018) was held in Cholpon-Ata, Kyrgyzstan from 2–8 September 2018 with 37 sports being featured in the games. Featured sports include eagle hunting, bone throwing and kok-boru. The opening ceremony was attended by President of Kyrgyzstan Sooronbay Jeenbekov, Turkish President Recep Tayyip Erdogan, Hungarian Prime Minister Viktor Orbán and Kazakh President Nursultan Nazarbayev, Azerbaijani President Ilham Aliyev and Uzbek President Shavkat Mirziyoyev. It was announced during the festival that Kyrgyzstan would not be hosting the games in 2020, saying that Turkey would be hosting the games that year.

37 sports events were held, with 27 countries gaining medals.

Sports

Kyrgyz Kurosh 
Kazakh Kuresi
Goresh 
Kyrgyz Kurosh 
Kazakh Kuresi 
Kurash 
Gushtini Milli Kamarbandi
Mongol Bokh
Mass-wrestling
Pahlavani
Gyulesh
Ashyrtmaly Aba Gureshi (Aba kurosh)
Ssireum 
Sumo 
Alysh 
Great Nomad Wrestling
Sambo 
Armwrestling 
Tug of War 
Traditional Archery (Korea)
Traditional Archery (Kyrgyzstan)
Traditional Archery (Turkey)  
Traditional Horseback Archery (Mounted Archery) (Turkey and Kyrgyzstan)  
Traditional Distance Shooting Archery (Hungary)
Kok Boru 
Er Enish 
Endurance 
Flat Racing 
At Chabysh 
Kunan Chabysh 
Zhorgo Salysh 
Byshty Zhorgo 
BURKUT SALUU 
TAIGAN ZHARYSH 
DALBA 
Mangala 
Oware
Togyz Korgool 
Ordo
Cirit (Cancelled)

Medals
Spurce:

References

External links
Official website

World Nomad Games
2018 in Asian sport
2018 in Kyrgyzstani sport
International sports competitions hosted by Kyrgyzstan
Multi-sport events in Kyrgyzstan